Elbridge Gerry Chapman Jr. (November 20, 1895 – July 6, 1954) was a senior United States Army officer who served in both World War I and World War II. During the latter he commanded the 13th Airborne Division, but saw no action.

Early life and education
Chapman attended the University of Colorado, where he played college football and was captain of the 1916 Colorado Silver and Gold football team.

Military career
Chapman entered the United States Army in 1917, due to the American entry into World War I and was commissioned as a second lieutenant into the Infantry Branch. He served with distinction on the Western Front in France as a company commander with the 5th Machine Gun Battalion (attached to the 1st Battalion, 9th Infantry Regiment, 2nd Infantry Division) and was awarded the Distinguished Service Cross and the Silver Star Citation for valor.

During the interwar period he remained in the army and by the time the United States entered World War II in December 1941 he was an enthusiastic supporter of the army's rapidly growing airborne forces, commanding the 88th Glider Infantry Battalion, later becoming the Assistant Division Commander of the 13th Airborne Division, later commanding the division in North-West Europe but never commanded it in action.

He retired from the army in 1946, after almost thirty years of service, and died in San Bruno, California, in July 1954, aged 58.

In media
Chapman was portrayed in the television miniseries Band of Brothers by David Andrews.

References

External links
 Generals of World War II

|-

1895 births
1954 deaths
United States Army Infantry Branch personnel
Colorado Buffaloes football players
Recipients of the Distinguished Service Cross (United States)
Recipients of the Distinguished Service Medal (US Army)
Recipients of the Silver Star
United States Army personnel of World War I
United States Army generals of World War II
United States Army generals
Players of American football from Denver
Military personnel from Colorado